Richard Daft (2 November 1835 – 18 July 1900) was an English cricketer. He was one of the best batsmen of his day, the peak of his first-class career (which lasted from 1858 to 1891) being the 1860s and early 1870s.

Life and career
Born in Nottingham, most of his important matches were played for Nottinghamshire and the All England Eleven, and he captained the former side from 1871 to 1880. Unusually for the period, after beginning his career as a professional he later became an amateur. Two of his most notable innings were 118 at Lord's for North against South in 1862 and 102 for the Players against the Gentlemen (see Gentlemen v Players) at Lord's in 1872.

He led a strong side to North America in late 1879, which beat a XV of Philadelphia. He appeared in only a handful of matches after 1880.

A portrait of him painted in 1875 by Frank Miles is owned by Nottinghamshire County Cricket Club.  Miles's family were keen cricketers with a number of his brothers playing for Nottinghamshire.

It was written of him: "Not a big hitter, but played a thoroughly sound and at the same time graceful game." He was ridiculed on one occasion when he came out to bat with his head wrapped in a towel for protection in protest at what turned out to be a fatal injury received by the previous batsman (George Summers), due to short-pitched bowling on the notoriously uneven Lord's pitch.

He wrote Kings of Cricket: Reminiscences and Anecdotes with Hints on the Game, which was published by J. W. Arrowsmith/Simpkin, Marshall, Hamilton, Kent & Co. in 1893.

Daft ran the nearby Trent Bridge Inn and at one time he was a partner in the Radcliffe Brewery, but he died bankrupt at Radcliffe on Trent in 1900.

His brother, Charles, his sons, Harry and Richard, and his father-in-law, Butler Parr, all played first-class cricket. In August 1891, he played with Harry in the county eleven, at Kennington Oval against Surrey. Richard had returned to the Nottinghamshire side after an absence of ten years because Arthur Shrewsbury was forced to stand down through injury. Neither father nor son made any particular impact in this game, with Harry scoring 5 and 0, and Richard 12 and 2 as Surrey won by an innings and 46 runs.

His great-grandson Robin Butler served as the Cabinet Secretary (1988–1998).

References

External links

 Kings of Cricket by Richard Daft, digitised version at HathiTrust

1835 births
1900 deaths
People from Radcliffe-on-Trent
Cricketers from Nottinghamshire
English cricketers
Nottinghamshire cricketers
All-England Eleven cricketers
English cricketers of 1826 to 1863
English cricketers of 1864 to 1889
Nottinghamshire cricket captains
United North of England Eleven cricketers
Marylebone Cricket Club cricketers
Gentlemen cricketers
North v South cricketers
Players cricketers
Left-Handed v Right-Handed cricketers
Married v Single cricketers
Gentlemen of the North cricketers
R. Daft's XI cricketers